Malapterurus oguensis is a species of electric catfish native to Cameroon, the Republic of the Congo, and Gabon. The species grows to a length of  SL.

References

Malapteruridae
Catfish of Africa
Fish of the Republic of the Congo
Freshwater fish of Cameroon
Fish of Gabon
Taxa named by Henri Émile Sauvage
Fish described in 1879
Strongly electric fish